Roxbury Park may refer to:

Luna Park, Johnstown, Pennsylvania
Roxbury Heritage State Park, Boston, Massachusetts
Roxbury Memorial Park, Beverly Hills, California
West Roxbury Parkway, Boston, Massachusetts

See also
Roxbury (disambiguation)